Brazil national under-15 football team (Seleção Brasileira de Futebol Sub-15), also known as Brazil Under-15 or Seleção Sub-15, represents Brazil in association football, at an under-15 age level and is controlled by the Brazilian Football Confederation, the governing body for football in Brazil.

Titles
South American Under-15 Football Championship
Winners (5): 2005, 2007, 2011, 2015, 2019
Runners-up (2): 2009, 2017
Tampa International Tournament
Winners: 2005

References

External links
 RSSSF Brazil - U-15 Brazil National Team Archive

Youth football in Brazil
under-15
South American national under-15 association football teams